This is a list of commonly used land mines.

Mines by type

Anti-personnel mines

Fragmentation and stake mines

Shaped charge mines

 C3A1 mine
 C3A2 mine

Directional mines

Blast mines

Bounding mines

Flame mines
 Abwehrflammenwerfer 42
 Flame fougasse
 X-200 mine
 XM-54 mine

Chemical mines

 Livens Projector see note
 KhF-1 bounding gas mine
 KhF-2 bounding gas mine
 M1 chemical mine
 M23 chemical mine
 Spruh-Buchse 37
 Yperite mine

Anti-vehicle mines

Blast mines

Shaped charge/Misznay Schardin effect

Full width mines

Side attack mines

Wide area mines

 M93 HORNET mine

Anti-helicopter mines
 4AHM-100 mine
 AHM-200 mine
 AHM-200-1 mine
 AHM-200-2 mine
 Anti-Transport Mine
 Helkir mine
 PMN-150 mine
 PMN-250 mine
 TEMP 20

Nuclear land mines

 Blue Peacock
 Medium Atomic Demolition Munition
 Special Atomic Demolition Munition

Mines by country of origin

Argentina
 FMK-1 mine
 FMK-3 mine
 FMK-5 mine
 MAPG mine
 MAPPG mine

Austria
 Helkir mine

Bulgaria
 4AHM-100 mine
 AHM-200 mine
 AHM-200-1 mine
 AHM-200-2 mine
 Anti Transport Mine (Bulgaria)
 PMN-150 mine
 PMN-250 mine

Canada
C3A1 mine
DM-21 mine

People's Republic of China

Cuba
AT-8 (Cuban mine)
PMFH-1 mine
PMFH-2 mine

Former Czechoslovakia
PP Mi-SK mine (A Czechoslovakian copy of the POMZ-2 mine, used with an RO-1 fuze.)

Sweden
M/47 mine
FFV 016 mine
FFV 028 mine

France
MAPED F1 (France)
Model 1948 mine

Germany

Italy

Japan
 Type 93 mine
 Type 96 mine
 Type 67 mine
 Type 99 mine

Myanmar 
 MM-1 mine

South Africa
 Mini MS-803 (South Africa)

Serbia
 MRUD (Serbia)

Former Soviet Union/Russia

Sri Lanka
Johnny Landmine 95 (LTTE)
Rangan 99
P4Mk1
Type 72

United Kingdom

United States

Former Yugoslavia
 MRUD (Serbia)
 PROM-1
 PMA-2 "Pašteta"
 PMA-3 mine
 PMR-1 mine
 PMR-2A mine
 TMM-1

Vietnam
MD-82 mine
MBV-78A1 mine

See also

Notes

References
 Jane's Mines and Mine Clearance 2005-2006
 Brassey's Essential Guide to Anti-Personnel Landmines, Eddie Banks
 Foreign Mine Warfare Equipment, TM 5-223